This is a list of film festivals in India.

A
 Aryan International Children's Film Festival of Jaipur
 Alpavirama South Asian Short and Documentary Film Festival
 Ambarnath Film Festival
 Amdavad Film Festival

B
 Bangalore Queer Film Festival
 Best Film First
 Bioscope Global Film Festival
 Bodhisattava International Film Festival
 Brahmapur International Film Festival
 Brahmaputra Valley Film Festival
 Bring Your Own Film Festival
 Bengaluru International Film Festival
 Black Swan International Film Festival

C
 Calcutta International Short Film Festival
 Calcutta International Cult Film Festival
 Chennai International Film Festival
 Chennai International Queer Film Festival
 CIHfestival (Central Indian Highlands Wildlife Film Festival)
 Cinemela Film Festival
 Cineville Annual Film Festival
 Confluence India International Film Festival
 Cult Critic Movie Awards
 Chandigarh Music & Film Festival

D
 Darbhanga International Film Festival
 Development Film Festival
 Dharamshala International Film Festival
 Diorama International Film Festival
 Directorate of Film Festival 
 Diamond Cut International Film Festival
 Dehradun International Film Festival

F
 Filmsaaz
 Flashpoint Human Rights Film Festival

G
 The Great Indian Film and Literature Festival
 The Golden Elephant
 Golden Jury Film Festival
 Guwahati International Film Festival
 Gangtok International Film Festival

H
 Habitat International Film Festival, New Delhi
 Hyderabad Bengali Film Festival
 Hyderabad International Film Festival

I
 International Film Festival of India
 Independent Film Festival of Chennai
 India Film Project
 Indogma Film Festival
 International Cinema Festival of India
 International Film Festival of Kerala
 International Kids Film Festival (IKFF)

J
 Jaipur Film Market-JFM
 Jagran Film Festival
 Jaipur International Film Festival
 Jeevika Film Festival
 Jeevika: Asia Livelihood Documentary Festival
 KASHISH Mumbai International Queer Film Festival

K
 Kalakari Film Festival
 Kolkata International Film Festival
 Karnataka Youth International Short Film Festival
 Knight Of The Reel Awards

L
 Ladakh International Film Festival
 LAKECITY International Film Festival
 L'Age D'or International Art House Film Festival
 Luis Bunuel Memorial Awards

M
 Madhubani Film Festival 
 Madras Independent Film Festival
 Madras Independent Film Festival
 Martand Bharati International Film Festival
 Martand Bharati International Film Festival
 Mumbai Academy of the Moving Image
 Mumbai Film Festival
 Mumbai Women's International Film Festival
 Mountain View International Film Festival (MVIFF)

N
 National Children's Film
 New Delhi Film Festival
 National Science Film Festival and Competition
 7 Sisters North East International Film Festival

O
 Osian's Cinefan Festival of Asian and Arab Cinema
 One Leaf International Film Festival
 Oasis International Film Festival

P
 Patna Film Festival
 Piggy Bank International Short Film Festival
 Pune International Film Festival

R
 Rajasthan Film Festival
 Rajasthan International Film Festival
 Ritu Rangam Film Festival
 Rolling Reels Film Festival - RRFF
 Royal Society of Television & Motion Pictures Awards (RSTMPA)

S

 Sieger Short Film International Festival - SSFIF
 Seven Sister International Film Festival- 7SNEIFF
 SKG International Film Festival - SIFF
 Shahu International Film Festival - SIFF 
 SiGNS Film Festival
 Smita Patil International Film Festival
 Syne International Film Festival

T
 Tigerland India Film Festival
 Thrissur International Film Festival
 Tagore International Film Festival

V
 VadFest
 Verite Film Festival (Kashmir)
 ViBGYOR Film Festival
 Vintage International Film Festival
 Virgin Spring Cinefest

W
 WinterSun International Film Festival
 Woodpecker International Film Festival

See also

References

Film
Film festivals
India
India